Zlatyu Georgiev Boyadzhiev (22 October 1903 – 2 February 1976) was a Bulgarian painter. He is known for his portraits and landscapes, depicting mainly the Old Town of Plovdiv, Bulgaria's second largest city, and village life in the region.

Life
Born in the village of Brezovo, Boyadzhiev graduated in painting from the Academy of Fine Arts in Sofia in 1932. His work is generally divided into two main periods: until 1951, when he suffered a stroke and temporarily gave up painting, and from the of his partial recovery a few years later until his death in 1976. After the stroke, he worked with his left hand and in a completely different manner.

The first period is characterized by neoclassical style in composing scenes with scenes of rural life. In the second period of the artist's style changed radically in the direction of grotesque imagery, the inclusion of dozens of shapes in compositions and expressive color.

He was awarded the Hero of Socialist Labor, Winner of the Union of Bulgarian Artists "Vladimir Dimitrov - the Master." Among his most famous works are "Village of Brezovo," "On the table" and "Two weddings." Many of his paintings are displayed in a house museum in Plovdiv.

References

Sources 
 
 
 

1903 births
1976 deaths
Landscape artists
Portrait painters
20th-century Bulgarian painters
20th-century male artists
People from Plovdiv Province
Male painters